Gomez House or Gomez Residencia may refer to:

Schwalen-Gomez House, Tucson, Arizona, listed on the NRHP in Pima County, Arizona
Refugio Gomez House, Albuquerque, New Mexico, listed on the NRHP in Bernalillo County, New Mexico
Gómez Residence, Mayagüez, Puerto Rico